Cameron David "Scooter" Magruder (born December 2, 1988) is an American YouTube personality, actor, comedian and new media consultant. As of October 2021, the videos on his primary account have been viewed over 97 million times with over 603,000 subscribers to his channel.

Biography 
Magruder was born in Orlando, Florida.

In the summer of 2003, Magruder was a contestant on the reality show Endurance 2, which aired on NBC & Discovery Kids. The show was taped in Baja California and was hosted by JD Roth. The show prompted Magruder to begin creating videos. It was also during this show where Magruder learned the ins and outs of television production. Magruder and his partner Christa Scholtz competed as the Blue Team and finished in 6th place.

He graduated from Dr. Phillips High School in 2007 as senior class president.   He then attended and graduated from the University of Florida cum laude with a degree in telecommunication production. After graduation, Magruder completed one year with Americorps.

Career 

Magruder started regularly posting YouTube videos in August 2011.  Magruder makes videos on wide ranging topics, including Top 100 videos where he lists 100 things of a certain genre, and his "Not About That Life" series where he rants about things he hates and/or doesn't understand, and multiple other formats, including vlogs, how-to videos, and relationship advice videos. Each video is introduced by Magruder saying "What's up guys, hope you're doing well." Each video ends by him saying his catch phrases: "No Jugamos Juegos" (Translated from Spanish meaning "we don't play games") and "Throw me the alley." None of Magruder's videos contain any curse words since he tries to exemplify his Christian values through his videos. Magruder's videos have been posted on the Huffington Post, RightThisMinute, NBATV, ESPN, the Orlando Sentinel, the Miami Herald, and even the Today Show. His most successful video to date is "Top 100 Things Fortnite Players Say" with over 4,400,000 views.

In the summer of 2012, Magruder was selected to be one of sixteen YouTube Next Vloggers. Vloggers received $5,000 in equipment, $10,000 in YouTube promotional advertisement for their channel, as well as mentoring from other Top Vloggers such as iJustine and Natalie Tran of Community Channel Sixteen "Next Vloggers" in total were selected from over thousands of applicants worldwide.

Magruder is very famous for his videos titled "Things _ fans say" where he imitates a certain team's fanbase. He has also made it known he is a huge fan of sports. He is a fan of the Orlando Magic for Basketball because Orlando is his birthplace. He is a fan of the Florida Gators for college sports because he got his education from the University of Florida. He is a fan of the Dallas Cowboys for Football because as he describes: "he's an American citizen" (In reference to the Cowboys titular nickname America's Team). His dad was a Cowboys fan whilst his mother was a Dolphins fan. He also roots for the Tampa Bay Rays and the Tampa Bay Lightning. Starting in 2020, Magruder became a part of "Clickbait Sports", a weekly show about sports hosted by himself, Five Points Vids, Urinating Tree, Tom Grossi and That's Good Sports. The videos are simulcasted on Magruder's Twitch, as well as the other's Youtube channel.

References

External links 
Scooter Magruder's Website
Scooter Magruder's Channel on YouTube

1988 births
Living people
African-American male comedians
American male comedians
21st-century American comedians
American Internet celebrities
Dr. Phillips High School alumni
Male actors from Orlando, Florida
University of Florida alumni
21st-century African-American people
American Christians
African-American Christians
Participants in American reality television series
20th-century African-American people